Globovula is a genus of sea snails, marine gastropod mollusks in the family Ovulidae.

Species
Species within the genus Globovula include:

Globovula cavanaghi (Iredale, 1931)
Globovula sphaera Cate, 1973

References

External links
 

Ovulidae